Panagia is a former municipality in Chalkidiki, Greece. Since the 2011 local government reform it is part of the municipality Aristotelis, of which it is a municipal unit. The 2011 census recorded 3,526 inhabitants in the municipal unit.

Administrative division
The municipal unit of Panagia consists of 3 communities:
 Gomati
 Megali Panagia
 Pyrgadikia
The seat of the municipality was in Megali Panagia.

See also
 List of settlements in Chalkidiki

References

Populated places in Chalkidiki